In mathematics, and especially differential geometry and gauge theory, a connection on a fiber bundle is a device that defines a notion of parallel transport on the bundle; that is, a way to "connect" or identify fibers over nearby points. The most common case is that of a linear connection on a vector bundle, for which the notion of parallel transport must be linear. A linear connection is equivalently specified by a covariant derivative, an operator that differentiates sections of the bundle along tangent directions in the base manifold, in such a way that parallel sections have derivative zero. Linear connections generalize, to arbitrary vector bundles, the Levi-Civita connection on the tangent bundle of a pseudo-Riemannian manifold, which gives a standard way to differentiate vector fields. Nonlinear connections generalize this concept to bundles whose fibers are not necessarily linear.

Linear connections are also called Koszul connections after Jean-Louis Koszul, who gave an algebraic framework for describing them .

This article defines the connection on a vector bundle using a common mathematical notation which de-emphasizes coordinates. However, other notations are also regularly used: in general relativity, vector bundle computations are usually written using indexed tensors; in gauge theory, the endomorphisms of the vector space fibers are emphasized. The different notations are equivalent, as discussed in the article on metric connections (the comments made there apply to all vector bundles).

Motivation

Let  be a differentiable manifold, such as Euclidean space.

The model case is to differentiate a function  on Euclidean space . In this setting the derivative  at a point  in the direction  may be defined by the standard formula

For every , this defines a new vector 

When passing to a section  of a vector bundle  over a manifold , one encounters two key issues with this definition. Instead one takes a path  such that  and computes 

The problem is resolved by introducing the extra structure of a connection to the vector bundle. There are at least three perspectives from which connections can be understood. When formulated precisely, all three perspectives are equivalent.

In fact, the following notion of "Ehresmann connection" is nothing but an infinitesimal formulation of parallel transport.
A covariant derivative is defined to be any operation  which mimics these properties, together with a form of the product rule. 

Unless the base is zero-dimensional, there are always infinitely many connections which exist on a given differentiable vector bundle, and so there is always a corresponding choice of how to differentiate sections. Depending on context, there may be distinguished choices, for instance those which are determined by solving certain partial differential equations. In the case of the tangent bundle, any pseudo-Riemannian metric (and in particular any Riemannian metric) determines a canonical connection, called the Levi-Civita connection.

Formal definition
Let  be a smooth real vector bundle over a smooth manifold .
Beyond using the canonical identification between the vector space  and the vector space of linear maps  these two definitions are identical and differ only in the language used.

Remark. In the case of a complex vector bundle, the above definition is still meaningful, but is usually taken to be modified by changing "real" and "ℝ" everywhere they appear to "complex" and "" This places extra restrictions, as not every real-linear map between complex vector spaces is complex-linear. There is some ambiguity in this distinction, as a complex vector bundle can also be regarded as a real vector bundle.

Induced connections 

A connection on  induces a connection on any one of these associated bundles. The ease of passing between connections on associated bundles is more elegantly captured by the theory of principal bundle connections, but here we present some of the basic induced connections.

Dual connection 

Notice that this definition is essentially enforcing that  be the connection on  so that a natural product rule is satisfied for pairing .

Tensor product connection 
Given  connections on two vector bundles , define the tensor product connection by the formula

Here we have . Notice again this is the natural way of combining  to enforce the product rule for the tensor product connection.

Direct sum connection 

The direct sum connection is defined by

where .

Symmetric and exterior power connections 

Since the symmetric power and exterior power of a vector bundle may be viewed naturally as subspaces of the tensor power, the definition of the tensor product connection applies in a straightforward manner to this setting. Indeed, since the symmetric and exterior algebras sit inside the tensor algebra as direct summands, and the connection  respects this natural splitting, one can simply restrict  to these summands. Explicitly, define the symmetric product connection by

and the exterior product connection by

for all .

Endomorphism connection 

Finally, one may define the induced connection  on the vector bundle of endomorphisms , the endomorphism connection.

By reversing this equation, it is possible to define the endomorphism connection as the unique connection satisfying

for any , thus avoiding the need to first define the dual connection and tensor product connection.

Any associated bundle 

Given a vector bundle  of rank , and any representation  into a linear group , there is an induced connection on the associated vector bundle . Each of the above examples can be seen as special cases of this construction: the dual bundle corresponds to the inverse transpose (or inverse adjoint) representation, the tensor product to the tensor product representation, the direct sum to the direct sum representation, and so on.

Exterior covariant derivative and vector-valued forms

Let  be a vector bundle. An -valued differential form of degree  is a section of the tensor product bundle:

The space of such forms is denoted by

An -valued 0-form is just a section of the bundle . That is,

A connection may then be viewed as a generalization of the exterior derivative to vector bundle valued forms. In fact, given a connection  on  there is a unique way to extend  to an exterior covariant derivative

This exterior covariant derivative is defined by the following Leibniz rule, which is specified on simple tensors of the form  and extended linearly:

Notice that for -valued 0-forms, this recovers the normal Leibniz rule for the connection .

Unlike the ordinary exterior derivative, one generally has . In fact,  is directly related to the curvature of the connection  (see below).

Affine properties of the set of connections

Every vector bundle over a manifold admits a connection, which can be proved using partitions of unity. However, connections are not unique. That is,

This affine space is commonly denoted .

Relation to principal and Ehresmann connections

Given a section  of  let the corresponding equivariant map be .

This provides one method to construct the associated principal connection.

Local expression
Therefore over the set ,  admits a local smooth frame of sections

Since the frame  defines a basis of the fibre  for any , one can expand any local section  in the frame as

for a collection of smooth functions .

For any basis section , the quantity  may be expanded in the local frame  as

where  are a collection of local one-forms. These forms can be put into a matrix of one-forms defined by

If the local section  is also written in matrix notation as a column vector using the local frame  as a basis,

then using regular matrix multiplication one can write

In this notation, one often writes locally that . In this sense a connection is locally completely specified by its connection one-form in some trivialisation.

As explained in #Affine properties of the set of connections, any connection differs from another by an endomorphism-valued one-form.

Relationship to Christoffel symbols 

In pseudo-Riemannian geometry, the Levi-Civita connection is often written in terms of the Christoffel symbols  instead of the connection one-form . It is possible to define Christoffel symbols for a connection on any vector bundle, and not just the tangent bundle of a pseudo-Riemannian manifold. To do this, suppose that in addition to  being a trivialising open subset for the vector bundle , that  is also a local chart for the manifold , admitting local coordinates .

The expression for how  acts in local coordinates can be further expanded in terms of the local chart  and the Christoffel symbols, to be given by

Contracting this expression with the local coordinate tangent vector  leads to

This defines a collection of  locally defined operators

with the property that

Change of local trivialisation 

In matrix notation this may be written

where  is the matrix of one-forms given by taking the exterior derivative of the matrix  component-by-component.

Parallel transport and holonomy

A section  of  along  is said to be parallel if

for all .

The above equation defining parallel sections is a first-order ordinary differential equation (cf. local expression above) and so has a unique solution for each possible initial condition. Define a parallel transport map

This is the subgroup of  consisting of all parallel transport maps coming from loops based at :

The holonomy group of a connection is intimately related to the curvature of the connection .

The connection can be recovered from its parallel transport operators as follows. In particular for every , we have . Then  defines a curve in the vector space , which may be differentiated. The covariant derivative is recovered as

Curvature

That is,

It is defined by the expression

As mentioned above, the covariant exterior derivative  need not square to zero when acting on -valued forms. The operator  is, however, strictly tensorial (i.e. -linear). This 2-form is precisely the curvature form given above. For an -valued form  we have

A flat connection is one whose curvature form vanishes identically.

Local form and Cartan's structure equation 

The curvature form has a local description called Cartan's structure equation.

To clarify this notation, notice that  is a endomorphism-valued one-form, and so in local coordinates takes the form of a matrix of one-forms. The operation  applies the exterior derivative component-wise to this matrix, and  denotes matrix multiplication, where the components are wedged rather than multiplied.

Further expanding this in terms of the Christoffel symbols  produces the familiar expression from Riemannian geometry.

It can be checked that if we define  to be wedge product of forms but commutator of endomorphisms as opposed to composition, then , and with this alternate notation the Cartan structure equation takes the form

This alternate notation is commonly used in the theory of principal bundle connections, where instead we use a connection form , a Lie algebra-valued one-form, for which there is no notion of composition (unlike in the case of endomorphisms), but there is a notion of a Lie bracket.

In some references (see for example ) the Cartan structure equation may be written with a minus sign:

This different convention uses an order of matrix multiplication that is different from the standard Einstein notation in the wedge product of matrix-valued one-forms.

Bianchi identity

A version of the second (differential) Bianchi identity from Riemannian geometry holds for a connection on any vector bundle. This endomorphism connection has itself an exterior covariant derivative, which we ambiguously call . Since the curvature is a globally defined -valued two-form, we may apply the exterior covariant derivative to it. The Bianchi identity says that
.
This succinctly captures the complicated tensor formulae of the Bianchi identity in the case of Riemannian manifolds, and one may translate from this equation to the standard Bianchi identities by expanding the connection and curvature in local coordinates.

There is no analogue in general of the first (algebraic) Bianchi identity for a general connection, as this exploits the special symmetries of the Levi-Civita connection.

Gauge transformations 

Given two connections  on a vector bundle , it is natural to ask when they might be considered equivalent. There is a well-defined notion of an automorphism of a vector bundle . A section  is an automorphism if  is invertible at every point . The group of gauge transformations may be neatly characterised as the space of sections of the capital A adjoint bundle  of the frame bundle of the vector bundle . This is not to be confused with the lowercase a adjoint bundle , which is naturally identified with  itself. Notice that despite having the same fibre as the frame bundle  and being associated to it,  is not equal to the frame bundle, nor even a principal bundle itself. The gauge group may be equivalently characterised as 

A gauge transformation  of  acts on sections , and therefore acts on connections by conjugation.

To check that  is a connection, one verifies the product rule

which is to say that .

Examples

 A classical covariant derivative or affine connection defines a connection on the tangent bundle of M, or more generally on any tensor bundle formed by taking tensor products of the tangent bundle with itself and its dual.
 A connection on  can be described explicitly as the operator

A section  may be identified with a map 

and then

 If the bundle is endowed with a bundle metric, an inner product on its vector space fibers, a metric connection is defined as a connection that is compatible with the bundle metric.
 A Yang-Mills connection is a special metric connection which satisfies the Yang-Mills equations of motion.
 A Riemannian connection is a metric connection on the tangent bundle of a Riemannian manifold.
 A Levi-Civita connection is a special Riemannian connection: the metric-compatible connection on the tangent bundle that is also torsion-free. It is unique, in the sense that given any Riemannian connection, one can always find one and only one equivalent connection that is torsion-free.  "Equivalent" means it is compatible with the same metric, although the curvature tensors may be different; see teleparallelism. The difference between a Riemannian connection and the corresponding Levi-Civita connection is given by the contorsion tensor.
 More generally, there is a canonical flat connection on any flat vector bundle (i.e. a vector bundle whose transition functions are all constant) which is given by the exterior derivative in any trivialization.

See also
 D-module
 Connection (mathematics)

References

 

 
 
 

 Donaldson, S.K. and Kronheimer, P.B., 1997. The geometry of four-manifolds. Oxford University Press.

 Tu, L.W., 2017. Differential geometry: connections, curvature, and characteristic classes (Vol. 275). Springer.

 Taubes, C.H., 2011. Differential geometry: Bundles, connections, metrics and curvature (Vol. 23). OUP Oxford.

 Lee, J.M., 2018. Introduction to Riemannian manifolds. Springer International Publishing.
 

Connection (mathematics)
Vector bundles